Expoobident is an album by jazz trumpeter Lee Morgan originally released on the Vee-Jay label.  It was recorded on October 14, 1960 and features performances by Morgan with Clifford Jordan, Eddie Higgins, Art Davis and Art Blakey.

Reception
The Allmusic review by Steve Loewy awarded the album 4 stars stating, "The set is a tad more laid-back than the later classic Blue Note sessions. Nonetheless, this one offers its rewards, including a rare chance to hear Eddie Higgins in full force, a late of Blakey as a sideman, and a stunning front line with unsung giant Clifford Jordan."

Track listing 
 "Expoobident" (Higgins) – 5:01
 "Easy Living" (Rainger, Robin) – 5:57
 "Triple Track" (Morgan) – 5:00
 "Fire" (Shorter) – 4:51
 "Just in Time" (Styne, Comden, Green) – 3:32
 "The Hearing" (Jordan) – 3:36
 "Lost and Found" (Jordan) – 3:35

Bonus tracks on CD reissue:
"Expoobident" [Alternate take] – 5:06
 "Triple Track [Alternate take] – 5:12
 "Fire" [Alternate take] – 5:07
 "Just in Time" [Alternate take] – 5:46

Personnel 
 Lee Morgan – trumpet
 Clifford Jordan – tenor saxophone
 Eddie Higgins – piano
 Art Davis – bass
 Art Blakey – drums

References 

Hard bop albums
Lee Morgan albums
1961 albums
Vee-Jay Records albums